WERF-LP (105.7 FM) is a low-power educational radio station in Gainesville, Florida. WERF-LP is the second LPFM to broadcast in the Gainesville area and the first to offer a schedule based upon non-religious programs. WERF-LP broadcasts a Top-40 format from a transmitter facility located approximately 9 miles west of downtown.

External links
 

ERF-LP
ERF-LP
Radio stations established in 2007
2007 establishments in Florida
Contemporary hit radio stations in the United States